Solomon Islands competed at the 2018 Commonwealth Games in the Gold Coast, Australia from April 4 to April 15, 2018.

Weightlifter Jenly Tegu Wini was the country's flag bearer during the opening ceremony.

Tegu Wini won the country's first ever Commonwealth Games medal, when she won bronze in the women's 58 kg weightlifting event.

Medalists

Competitors
The following is the list of number of competitors participating at the Games per sport/discipline.

Athletics

The Solomon Islands participated with 4 athletes (2 men and 2 women).

Track & road events

Boxing

The Solomon Islands participated with a team of 1 athlete (1 man).

Men

Swimming

The Solomon Islands participated with 2 athletes (1 man and 1 woman).

Table tennis

The Solomon Islands participated with 2 athletes (1 man and 1 woman).

Singles

Doubles

Triathlon

The Solomon Islands participated with 2 athletes (2 men).

Individual

Weightlifting

The Solomon Islands participated with 3 athletes (1 man and 2 women).

See also
Solomon Islands at the 2018 Summer Youth Olympics

References

Nations at the 2018 Commonwealth Games
Solomon Islands at the Commonwealth Games
2018 in Solomon Islands sport